The 1983 Men's EuroHockey Nations Championship was the fourth edition of the Men's EuroHockey Nations Championship, the quadrennial international men's field hockey championship of Europe organized by the European Hockey Federation. It was held in Amstelveen, Netherlands from 18 to 28 August 1983.

The hosts the Netherlands won their first title by defeating the Soviet Union 8–6 in penalty strokes after the match finished 2–2 after extra time. The defending champions West Germany won the bronze medal by defeating Spain 3–1.

Preliminary round

Pool A

Pool B

Classification round

Ninth to twelfth place classification

9–12th place semi-finals

Eleventh place game

Ninth place game

Fifth to eighth place classification

5–8th place semi-finals

Seventh place game

Fifth place game

First to fourth place classification

Semi-finals

Third place game

Final

Final standings

References

Men's EuroHockey Nations Championship
EuroHockey Nations Championship
EuroHockey Nations Championship
International field hockey competitions hosted by the Netherlands
Sports competitions in Amstelveen
EuroHockey Nations Championship